Carla Somaini  (born 13 October 1991) is a Swiss snowboarder who competes internationally.
 
She represented Switzerland at the 2018 Winter Olympics.

References

External links 
 

1991 births
Living people
Swiss female snowboarders 
Olympic snowboarders of Switzerland 
Snowboarders at the 2018 Winter Olympics 
Universiade bronze medalists for Switzerland
Universiade medalists in snowboarding
Competitors at the 2013 Winter Universiade
Competitors at the 2015 Winter Universiade
21st-century Swiss women